Kališta is a village in the municipality of Struga, North Macedonia.

Demographics
The village of Kališta is inhabited by Tosks, a subgroup of southern Albanians and speak the Tosk Albanian dialect, as well as ethnic Macedonians.

As of the 2021 census, Kališta had 764 residents with the following ethnic composition:
Albanians 623
Macedonians 115
Persons for whom data are taken from administrative sources 23
Others 3

According to the 2002 census, the village had a total of 1178 inhabitants. Ethnic groups in the village include:

Albanians 1079
Macedonians 95
Turks
Vlachs 1 
Serbs 1 
Others 2

References

External links

Villages in Struga Municipality
Albanian communities in North Macedonia